Jeki Arisandi (born 30 November 1990, in Palembang) is an Indonesian professional footballer who plays as a left-back for Liga 2 club Putra Delta Sidoarjo.

Club career
Jeki made his debut for Sriwijaya FC in the 2011 AFC Cup against Maldives club, VB Addu FC on March 1, 2011 as a reserve player.

He had played for PS Bangka and Persis Solo in the 2013 season before eventually returning to play for Sriwijaya FC

Madura United
Jeki joined to Madura United in 2016 Indonesia Soccer Championship A. He played 11 minutes against Pusamania Borneo

Persegres Gresik United
In 2017 season, Jeki joined to Persegres Gresik United for 2017 Piala Presiden and 2017 Liga 1.

Honours

Club
Persita Tangerang
 Liga 2 runner-up: 2019

References

1990 births
Living people
Indonesian footballers
People from Palembang
Sriwijaya F.C. players
Persis Solo players
Persegres Gresik players
Gresik United players
Liga 1 (Indonesia) players
Association football wing halves